</noinclude>

The Harley-Davidson Fat Boy,  is a V-twin softail cruiser motorcycle with solid-cast disc wheels. Designed by Willie G. Davidson and Louie Netz, Harley-Davidson built a prototype Fat Boy in Milwaukee for the Daytona Bike Week rally at Daytona Beach in 1988 and 1989. Fat Boys produced from 1990-2017 are coded FLSTF, and  FLFB (&  FLFBS) from 2018.

An oft-repeated false etymology claims that the name comes from a contraction of Fat Man and Little Boy, the atomic bombs dropped on Japan during WWII, as a symbolic insult to Japanese motorcycles. This has been debunked, as the name "Fat Boy" actually comes from the observation that the motorcycle is somewhat wider than other bikes when viewed head-on. In a 2015 interview, Scott Miller, Harley-Davidson's vice president of styling and product development, confirmed that the name was simply descriptive and had nothing to do with Harley's Japanese competitors.

History and development
The Fat Boy's frame is derived from the 1984 "Softail" which appears to have a rigid hardtail chassis but which in fact has a swinging arm with concealed springs that was originally designed in a Missouri garage in the 1970's by a mechanical engineer named Bill Davis and later Patented in 1976. Willie G the grandson of Harley-Davidson co-founder William A. Davidson originally turned down engineer Bill Davis' softail concept; but the company later relented, buying the rights and designing its own softail frame in-house.
 
 After 1994, the exhaust was made seamless. 
 In 1996 the master cylinder and switch gear were revised.  
 In 1999 a new  Twin Cam engine for the 2000 model year was used. This necessitated a bespoke engine variant and changes to the frame.
In 2002 bullet-style indicators, alarm and immobilizer were added.
In 2005 a 15th Anniversary version was sold with a "Screamin' Eagle" engine, special paint and custom wheels.
The 2010 "Fat Boy Lo" FLSTFB had the lowest ever Harley seat height.
In 2012 the Fat Boy received the new  Twin Cam engine along with the rest of the softail range
The 2018 Fat Boys have a redesigned softail frame with Showa front and rear suspension and new twin-counterbalanced  Milwaukee-Eight engines. The two 2018 variants comprise:
The  FLFBS  with 

The 2018 Softail frame has a modified swingarm with a Showa rear monoshock suspension mounted beneath the seat, replacing earlier twin shocks. So as to provide a more comfortable and better controlled ride with improved handling, the front forks contain a Showa "Dual Bending Valve" (SDBV), a cartridge simulator using two valves to control compression and rebound damping, giving linear damping characteristics proportional to fork stroke speed. Harley-Davidson claims the 2018 chassis is stiffer and lighter than earlier Softail and Dyna platforms. Further upgrades include an LED headlight and 18-inch "Lakester" rims, with wider 160mm front and 240mm rear tires.

For 2020, the Fat Boy is only available with the Milwaukee-Eight 114 engine. Harley-Davidson also produced a 30th Anniversary edition for 2020.

It is one of Harley-Davidson's best selling models and has appeared prominently in a number of TV shows and movies. The Fat Boy earned a place in American pop culture after appearances in the movie Terminator 2: Judgment Day. One of the motorcycles used in Terminator 2 is displayed at the Harley-Davidson Museum. It appeared again in Terminator Genisys.

See also

List of Harley-Davidson motorcycles

References

External links

Fat Boy
Motorcycles introduced in 1990
Cruiser motorcycles